The Shadow Cabinet is a superhero team created by Milestone Comics and published by DC Comics. They first appeared in Shadow Cabinet #0 (January 1994), and were created by Dwayne McDuffie, Robert L. Washington III and John Paul Leon. Almost all of the original run, issues #4-11 and #13-17, were written by Matt Wayne.

Publication history
In the Milestone Comics universe  the Shadow Cabinet is a secret organization of superhuman beings acting to protect the world by neutralizing potential threats while they are still relatively harmless - "to save humanity from itself, no matter what that requires".

Various Cabinet members may be sent on "deep-cover" missions lasting months, or even years (during which time some choose to defect), their total membership at any time is known only to their leader.

The base of operations for the Shadow Cabinet is the Shadowspire, a subterranean complex within the Himalayas and typically accessible only via the Shadowslide, their teleporter (so named because, if the subject's origin is not in complete darkness at the time of teleport, the machine overloads and cannot be used for up to an hour).

An all new Shadow Cabinet emerged in the post-Infinite Crisis DC Universe in pages of Justice League of America. After attempting to abduct Doctor Light they find themselves in conflict with the Justice League. It turns out that Icon and Superman were secretly working together and the two teams end up joining forces to save the universe as Dharma brings together the DC and Milestone universes into one unified continuity.

Team biography

Red Dog
Red Dog, a powerful Irish sorcerer, is the leader of the Shadow Cabinet from the late nineteenth century until the mid twentieth. Several of his people include 'Bent Nature', 'Ether', 'The Magnate' and 'Munition'.

Red Dog recruits Dharma as his replacement, but his activities do not end there. Dharma is slain by one of his own people and Red Dog steps in to bring him back to life. Red Dog disagrees with Dharma's efforts to take over the world and re-forms his own Cabinet to stop him.

Dharma
Dharma, otherwise known as Harry Chawney, has the power to perceive the past and future of any object he touches. He has perceived countless apocalypses, and is ruthless in acting to prevent them, whatever the cost. In theory, he knows the ultimate consequences of whatever action he sends his operatives to perform; however, the impossibility of considering every factor has led to his fear that he may be causing the very disasters he is trying to prevent - in the words of one agent: "What about the man who died? His future could have been important too. Did you check?", to which he was forced to respond: "I can't think about that right now".

The Cabinet makes an appearance in Blood Syndicate #20 when Dharma fires Oro, who has been a Syndicate associate, police officer, and a Shadow Cabinet operative. He is allowed to keep his costume and receives one month severance pay deposited directly into his bank account. Dharma even gives Oro advice to "take the left" as Oro teleports out.

The teleportation technology is maintained by powerful telekinetic and engineer Thomas Hague, better known as "Mechanic". Another notable employee is Payback, a spy for the independent superhero Icon. Icon also has evidence that Dharma had been involved in the 'Big Bang', a riot which, due to altered tear gas, ended with dozens of fatalities and superpowers granted to the survivors.

He would not treat further departures from the Cabinet as gracefully as Oro's. When Cabinet operatives Iota, Donner, and Blitzen leave to form the unofficial team Heroes, Dharma sends a Cabinet attack squad. This group is led by Iron Butterfly.

DC Universe
An all new Shadow Cabinet has appeared in the pages of Justice League of America. Following the death of Darkseid (as chronicled in Final Crisis), the space-time continuum was torn asunder, threatening the existence of both the Dakotaverse and the mainstream DC universe. The being known as Dharma was able to use energies that he harnessed from Rift (upon that being's defeat in Worlds Collide) to merge the two universes, creating an entirely new continuity. Only Dharma, Icon and Superman are aware that Dakota and its inhabitants have actually existed in a parallel universe. In the revised continuity, the Milestone characters have apparently always existed in the DC Universe.

Milestone Forever
In the 2010 limited series Milestone Forever, which details the end of the original Milestone universe before its merger into the DCU, the truth behind Dharma's actions is shown. It is revealed that he was responsible for the Big Bang, hoping to create powerful beings capable of preventing a fast-approaching apocalypse whose cause he could not determine. When his last two prospects, Hardware and Static, fail to meet his expectations, he turns to the only course he believes is left open to him; awakening and harnessing the powers of the god-like being Rift. However, the very act of absorbing the being's powers causes widespread destruction to the universe, destroying the Milestone Earth. Thus the cause of the apocalypse he foresaw was his own attempts to stop it, although not all is lost, as his new powers allow him the opportunity to bring about his universe's rebirth. The effects of Darkseid's death during the Final Crisis of a neighboring universe gives him the chance to merge the remnants of the Milestone Universe into the DC Universe, retroactively combining their histories, and giving the Milestone characters the chance to live anew.

Membership

Modern team
Bad Betty - a cyborg who was sent on a deep-cover mission to infiltrate organized crime.
Blitzen (Valerie Kameya) - is superhumanly fast as the result of a substance she developed herself. A Japanese biochemist who is in a lesbian marriage with Donner, later joins Heroes.

Donner (Gerri Brauer) - is superhumanly strong and resistant to injury. The German granddaughter of a Nazi geneticist, in a lesbian marriage with Blitzen, later joins Heroes.
Epiphany - appeared only once, upon being recalled from a deep-cover mission.
Iota (Isadora Wellington-Smythe) - is an international jewel thief with the ability to shrink herself and other objects.
Iron Butterfly (Kahina Eskandari) - is a Palestinian with ferrokinetic control of all metallic substances.
Payback (Kevin Franklin) - a Bang Baby able to transform into large yellow-green skinned monster with superhuman strength and durability.
Plus (Bina & Apurna Chawney) - are the teenage sisters of Harry Chawney (Dharma). Apurna is an energy being and lacks physical form; Bina uses this energy to fly and manipulate objects.
Ramjet - is a retired mercenary possessing superhuman strength and the power of flight. He first appeared upon being recalled from a deep-cover mission. Ramjet was later part of the Shadow Cabinet operatives ordered to destroy the Heroes.
Sideshow (Ramon Rand) - is a photojournalist who is able to transform any part of his body into the equivalent body part of any other animal species; this enables him to recover instantly from intoxication.
Starlight (Stella Maxwell) - is a college math major turned human pulsar with various electromagnetic abilities, later joins Heroes.
Twilight - both a living portal into another dimension, and the man forever trapped within that dimension, Twilight resembles a silhouette of a chubby man wearing a top hat. His whole body is covered in a texture that resembles the cloudy sky. He therefore strongly resembles a walking Magritte painting. His personal dimension is also home to a collection  of peculiar supernatural creatures which he has painstakingly acquired over the years; he can, at will, release them in the hopes that they will carry out his wishes (although he has no direct control over them). At one point, other operatives entered Twilight in the hopes that Dharma would not be able to perceive them, but whether this worked is not known.
Windshear - is capable of mentally creating whirlwinds of varying size and strength. She first appeared upon being recalled from a deep-cover mission. Windshear was later part of the Shadow Cabinet operatives ordered to destroy the Heroes.

Star Chamber

Star Chamber is a rogue faction which disagrees with Dharma; all its operatives have defected from the main group. Star Chamber also included several new recruits: Holocaust, Harm, Rocket and Xombi, although all of them left the group during the Shadow War.
 Ash - able to artificially induce rapid aging in inorganic objects, turning them to dust. Ash can induce this effect by touch or at a distance if the target is within line of sight. She also can telekinetically control any dust in her vicinity. Thus, Ash can create blinding dust storms or project dust as focused, high speed streams that rapidly erode their targets.
 Funyl - able to teleport himself or others via funnel-shaped teleportation portals.
 Headmaster - psychic abilities including mind control, characterized by a number of devices of various shapes which orbit his head.
 Rainsaw - a living cloud of several million microscopic razor-sharp fragments of metal capable of flying through the air at hurricane speeds. Rainsaw is capable of tearing through armor plating in less than a second. He can also turn his cloud-like form into any continuous shape imaginable.  Rainsaw can revert to a roughly humanoid form, in which he is capable of limited shapeshifting such as turning his hands into buzzsaws.
 Slag  - superhumanly strong with fire manipulation abilities.
 Transit - able to teleport people and objects she touches over great distances. Transit is unusual for a teleporter since she cannot teleport herself and must rely on other means for travel.
 Wytch - she has undefined powers (her name implies they are supernatural). She was seen flying and manipulating unknown energies during their battle with the Shadow Cabinet

DC Universe
A whole new Shadow Cabinet has appeared in the DC Universe proper. Although not officially part of the Shadow Cabinet, Hardware and Rocket were working with them when they confronted the Justice League. 
Blitzen
Donner
Iota
Payback
Starlight
Iron Butterfly
Twilight
Gloria Mundi
Dharma
Sideshow
Mechanic
Icon

References

External links
Shadow Cabinet Bios - Shadow Cabinet Bios page, part of Milestone the Milestone section of International Hero .co.uk
The Milestone Rave - includes a Shadow Cabinet comic book index and issue details.
Shadow Cabinet at the DC Database Project

Milestone Comics titles
DC Comics titles
Characters created by Dwayne McDuffie
Fictional intelligence agencies
Fictional secret societies